Claires Court School Boat Club is a rowing club based on the River Thames in Maidenhead.

History
The Club belongs to Claires Court School  and was founded in 1985 by a teacher at the school, Peter Jowitt.

In recent years the club has produced a number of junior national champions.

Honours

British champions

Key- J junior, 2, 4, 8 crew size, 18, 16, 15, 14 age group, x sculls, - coxless, + coxed

Henley Royal Regatta

References

Sport in Berkshire
Rowing clubs in England
Rowing clubs of the River Thames
Maidenhead
Scholastic rowing in the United Kingdom